The point guard (PG), also called the one or the point, is one of the five positions in a regulation basketball game. A point guard has perhaps the most specialized role of any position. Point guards are expected to run the team's offense by controlling the ball and making sure that it gets to the right player at the right time. Above all, the point guard must understand and accept their coach's game plan; in this way, the position can be compared to a quarterback in American football. They must also be able to adapt to what the defense is allowing and must control the pace of the game.

A point guard specializes in certain skills, like other player positions in basketball. Their primary job is to facilitate scoring opportunities for their team, or sometimes for themselves. Lee Rose has described a point guard as a coach on the floor, who can handle and distribute the ball to teammates. This typically involves setting up plays on the court, getting the ball to the teammate in the best position to score, and controlling the tempo of the game. A point guard should always look out for teammates and be able to pass well. A point guard should know when and how to instigate a fast break and when and how to initiate the more deliberate sets. Point guards are expected to be vocal floor leaders. A point guard needs to always to have in mind the shot clock and game clock times, the score, the numbers of remaining timeouts for both teams, etc.

Magic Johnson won the National Basketball Association Most Valuable Player Award (MVP) three times in his career. Steve Nash and Stephen Curry have each been named the NBA MVP twice. Other NBA point guards with wins include Bob Cousy, Oscar Robertson, Allen Iverson, Derrick Rose, and Russell Westbrook. Since 1969, Johnson and Curry are the only point guards who have won the league MVP, Finals MVP, and All-Star Game MVP awards in their careers. Notable point guards of the WNBA include five-time champion Sue Bird, her Olympic teammate Diana Taurasi (the only two basketball players of either gender to earn five Olympic gold medals for basketball) and Courtney Vandersloot. Having above-average size (height, muscle) is considered advantageous, although size is secondary to situational awareness, speed, quickness, and ball handling skills. At  the shortest player in NBA history, Muggsy Bogues enjoyed 889 games in a 14-year career as a point guard. 

After the opponent scores, it is typically the point guard who brings the ball down the court to begin an offensive play. Passing skills, ball handling, and court vision are crucial. Speed is important; a speedy point guard is better able to create separation and space off the dribble, giving themselves room to work. Point guards are often valued more for their assist totals than for their scoring. Another major evaluation factor is the assist-to-turnover ratio, which reflects the decision-making skills of the player. Still, a first-rate point guard should also have a reasonably effective jump shot.

Offense 
The point guard is positioned on the perimeter of the play, so as to have the best view of the action. This is a necessity because of the point guard's many leadership obligations. Many times, the point guard is referred to by announcers, as a "coach on the floor" or a "floor general". In the past, this was particularly true, as several point guards such as Lenny Wilkens served their teams as player coaches. This is not so common anymore, as most coaches are now solely specialized in coaching and are non-players. Some point guards are still given a great deal of leeway in the offense. Even point guards who are not given this much freedom, however, are still extensions of their coach on the floor and must display good leadership skills. 

Along with leadership and a general basketball acumen, ball-handling is a skill of great importance to a point guard. Generally speaking, the point guard is the player in possession of the ball for the most time during a game and is responsible for maintaining possession of the ball for their team in the face of any pressure from the opponents. Point guards must be able to maintain possession of the ball in crowded spaces and in traffic and be able to advance the ball quickly. A point guard that has enough ball-handling skill and quickness to be able to drive to the basket in a half-court set is also very valuable and considered by some to be a must for a successful offense.

After ball-handling, the most important areas of the game for a point guard are passing and scoring. As the primary decision-maker for a team, a point guard's passing ability determines how well a point guard is able to put their decision into play. It is one thing to be able to recognize the player that is in a tactically advantageous position, but it is another thing entirely to be able to deliver the ball to that player. For this reason, a point guard is usually, but not always, more skilled and focused on passing than shooting. However, a good jump shot and the ability to score off a drive to the basket are still valuable skills. A point guard will often use their ability to score in order to augment their effectiveness as a decision-maker and playmaker. 

In addition to the traditional role of the point guard, modern teams have found new ways to utilize the position. Notably, several modern point guards have used a successful style of post play, a tactic usually practiced by much larger centers and forwards. Exploiting the fact that the opposing point guard is often an undersized player with limited strength, several modern point guards have developed games close to the basket that include being able to utilize the drop step, spin move, and fade away jump shot.  

In recent years, the sport's shift from a fundamental style of play to a more athletic, scoring-oriented game resulted in the proliferation of so-called combo guards at the point guard position. More explosive and athletic point guards focus on scoring as opposed to play-making, forgoing assists and ball-movement, and often defense, for higher scoring numbers. Young players who are relatively short are now developing the scoring aspects of their skill-sets, whereas previously these players would find it difficult to enter the NBA without true point guard skills. These combo point guards can surprise defenses. Instead of passing after bringing up the ball they quickly drive to the basket or step back for an outside shot. There are some disadvantages to this style of play. A point guard often controls the offense and they also control who gets the ball and who doesn't, as this type of controlling style of play is necessary to control the tempo of a game. Scoring point guards typically look to score first, thus preventing teammates from getting the ball. This can cause other players to become disinvolved in the offense. Even so, combo guards still require above-average passing skill, but not as much as possessed by "pure" point guards (which is what those in the traditional mold of a point guard are referred to).

Defense
A point guard primarily defends on the perimeter, just as they primarily play on the perimeter on offense. On defense, the point guard is tasked with making the opposing point guard as ineffective as possible. A defensive point guard will try to accomplish this with constant pressure on the ball, making it difficult to maintain possession. A defensive point guard will also pressure opponents in passing lanes in an attempt to generate steals and scoring opportunities for their own team.

Current NBA point guards known for their defensive prowess include Jrue Holiday, Mike Conley Jr., Marcus Smart, and Chris Paul.

See also
 Bob Cousy Award – An annual award given to the nation's top NCAA male point guard
 Nancy Lieberman Award – The counterpart to the Cousy Award; given to the top NCAA female point guard
 Point forward – when a forward assumes the point guard duties

References

 The Basketball Handbook (pg 14) (2004). Lee H. Rose

External links

 , accessed 2008-02-09

 
Basketball positions
Basketball terminology